RuffNation Records was a joint venture record label between Chris Schwartz and Warner Bros. Records. It was started in 1999 after Ruffhouse Records was dissolved and remained active until 2001 when AOL bought Time Warner. The label was reactivated in 2020 as RuffNation Entertainment. The label is currently distributed by MNRK Music Group.

External links
 Ruffnation Youtube
Ruffnation Films Website
Ruffnation Films Official Myspace Page

See also 
 List of record labels

References

American record labels
Joint ventures
Hip hop record labels
Warner Music labels